Ebbw Vale railway station is located on the Main line in Queensland, Australia. It serves the suburb of Ebbw Vale in the City of Ipswich. 
It opened as St Helens, being renamed Ebbwvale in 1910. The name was hyphenated to Ebbw-vale and officially called Ebbw Vale by 1928.

Services
Ebbw Vale is served by trains operating to and from Ipswich and Rosewood. Most city-bound services run to Caboolture and Nambour, with some morning peak trains terminating at Bowen Hills. Some afternoon inbound services on weekdays run to Kippa-Ring. Ebbw Vale is nine minutes from Ipswich and 49 minutes on an all-stops train from Central.

Services by platform

*Note: One weekday morning service (4:56am from Central) and selected afternoon peak services continue through to Rosewood.  At all other times, a change of train is required at Ipswich.

References

External links

Ebbw Vale station Queensland Rail
Ebbw Vale station Queensland's Railways on the Internet

Ebbw Vale, Queensland
Railway stations in Ipswich City
Main Line railway, Queensland